Savings Bank of Danbury, is a full-service community bank and mortgage provider serving customers in Connecticut. The bank is headquartered in Danbury, Connecticut and was founded in 1849.

History
The bank was founded in 1849 under its current name, and was headquartered at 220 Main Street in what is today known as Downtown Danbury. This location remains the bank's headquarters to this day. The bank has 22 locations, and owns the subsidiaries SBD Bank and the Stamford Mortgage Company, which it acquired in 2010.

Notes

External links
 Official website
 SBD Bank
 Stamford Mortgage Company

Banks based in Connecticut
Banks established in 1849
Mutual savings banks in the United States
Mortgage lenders of the United States
Companies based in Fairfield County, Connecticut
Companies based in Danbury, Connecticut